4-Thiouridine is an atypical nucleotide formed with the 4-thiouracil base found in transfer RNA (tRNA). Its biosynthesis has been determined.

References 

Nucleosides
Pyrimidines
Hydroxymethyl compounds